"Best Song Ever" is a song recorded by English-Irish boy band One Direction. It was released on 22 July 2013 by Syco as the lead single from the group's third studio album, Midnight Memories. The song was written and composed by Wayne Hector, Ed Drewett, Matt Rad, along with the band's regular collaborators Julian Bunetta and John Ryan.

"Best Song Ever" debuted and peaked at number two on both the UK Singles Chart and the US Billboard Hot 100, making it their highest-charting single in the United States to date.

Composition
The song is written in the key of C-sharp major with a tempo of 120 beats per minute. It follows a chord progression of F♯-C♯-G♯.

Critical response
Will Hermes from Rolling Stone gave "Best Song Ever" a score of 4 out of 5 stars, describing the track as "pretty irresistible". Lewis Corner at Digital Spy also awarded the song 4 out of 5 stars, writing: "Sure the lyrics are cheesier than a 6-pack of Wotsits, and yes the sentiment is cornier than a Disney Channel rom-com, but as far as boyband pop anthems go it skirts dangerously close to fulfilling its title."

In the course of a debate on Twitter, it was noted the song's basic structure was similar to "Baba O'Riley" (1971) by the Who. Fans suggested the "Best Song Ever" was copied from the Who's song. Who guitarist Pete Townshend responded to the claims by denying that the Who were pursuing legal action, and stated that he was a fan of One Direction's single and was happy that One Direction appeared to have been influenced by the Who, just as he had been by his own guitar heroes such as Eddie Cochran.

Music video
The music video for "Best Song Ever" was directed by Ben Winston and written by comedian James Corden. Filmed over two days at The Temple House in Miami Beach, Florida, the video was released on the band's Vevo channel on 22 July 2013.

The video is over six minutes long and features the band arguing with clueless studio executives in a battle over their new image. Niall Horan plays studio executive Harvey (Harvey Weinstein), Louis Tomlinson plays studio executive Jonny (modelled after Tom Cruise's character Les Grossman in the movie Tropic Thunder), and Zayn Malik plays "The Sexy Assistant", Veronica. The studio executives are stoked to take the band to the proverbial next level, but they proceed to bring in an under-qualified crew consisting of Marcel, "The Marketing Guy" (Harry Styles) and Leeroy, "The Choreographer" (Liam Payne). Interspersed with scenes from their film One Direction: This is Us, the band are shown wreaking havoc throughout the office and even throwing in a few dance moves for good measure.

The music video won a British Video at the 2014 Brit Awards on 19 February 2014.

The video broke the Vevo 24-hour record with 12.3 million views, surpassing the 10.7 million views of Miley Cyrus' "We Can't Stop" in June, although the record was later broken again by Cyrus' follow-up music video "Wrecking Ball", which garnered 19.3 million views.

Live performances
The group performed "Best Song Ever" live for the first time on 30 July 2013 at the SAP center in San Jose, California during their Take Me Home Tour concert until their final live at Japan. The song was subsequently added to the set-list to all proceeding shows of the American leg. The group's first televised performance of the single was at the 2013 Teen Choice Awards on 11 August. The group also performed the song, along with some of their other hits, on The Today Show on 23 August, on America's Got Talent on 28 August, and again on The X Factor Australia on 27 October. On 15 November, the group performed "Best Song Ever" for the first time on British television at Children in Need 2013. Since its release, the song closed out all concerts for the 2014 Where We Are Tour and the 2015 On the Road Again Tour.

In popular culture
Musicians such as Gabrielle Aplin and The Vamps have covered "Best Song Ever". "Weird Al" Yankovic also covered the song as part of his polka medley "NOW That's What I Call Polka!" for his 2014 album Mandatory Fun. In the 100th episode of Mad, there's a sketch where One Direction watches the show and sings a parody of "Best Song Ever" calling it the worst show ever.

Track listings

Charts

Weekly charts

Year-end charts

Certifications

Release history

Awards
"Best Song Ever" won the award for Best Song of the Summer at the 2013 MTV Video Music Awards.

See also
"Tribute" by Tenacious D, another song about the greatest song
"Baba O'Riley by The Who

References

2013 singles
Dance-pop songs
One Direction songs
2013 songs
Syco Music singles
Columbia Records singles
Songs written by Wayne Hector
Songs written by Ed Drewett
Songs written by Julian Bunetta
Songs written by John Ryan (musician)